Challenging heights is a non-governmental organization in Ghana protecting the rights of children and focusing their anti-trafficking efforts in the fishing and cocoa industry. According to Challenging Heights, over 24,000 children in Ghana fall victim to the worst forms of child labour annually. Challenging Heights aim is to end Child Trafficking in the next 5 years through Rescue & Recovery, Prevention, and Advocacy. 

Rescue & Recovery- Challenging Heights conduct a number of rescue missions each year, rescuing dozens of children. Through tips from community members, they identify children who have been trafficked to Lake Volta. Once they have a list of trafficked children to be rescued, they go to Lake Volta, and rescue them from modern slavery. They are then brought to the Challenging Heights Hovde House. 

Prevention- In order for them to address child trafficking, they must think about the root causes. They have identified poverty, naivety, and family separation as the main three root causes. Through donations and grants, they have created a number of programs that they believe will help improve the lives of the people in the community. 
 Women Economic Empowerment Programme (WEEP)
 Youth Empowerment Programme (YEP)
 Child Development Khazanas (CDKs)
 Community Child Protection Committees (CCPCs)
 Alternative Dispute Resolution (ADR)

Advocacy-Challenging Heights works to change policies and practices in source communities, throughout Ghana, and globally. This advocacy work looks like sensitisation campaigns, lobbying for national policy, and consulting for the development of international guidelines. They are a community based that educates the citizens about Child Trafficking and Human Rights.  
 Community Sensitisation
 Promoting Children's Rights
 Partnering with Anti-Trafficking NGOs
 Research and Best Practices
 Partners in Development

History 
Challenging heights was founded by James Kofi Annan, who is himself a survivor of child trafficking and the worst forms of child labor. James is the last and the only educated out of twelve children of his illiterate parents and was forced to work as a fisherman in more than 20 villages along Lake Volta from the age of 6 to 13, before finally escaping.

James later rose to become a university graduate and also rose to become manager at Barclays Bank of Ghana. In April 2007, James resigned from Barclays Bank of Ghana and used his personal financing to perform rescues and promote the mission of Challenging Heights full-time.  After founding Challenging Heights, James is now known as a powerful and inspiring speaker and the recipient of numerous international awards and has become an globally recognized leader against slavery. 
 
The need for this work is encapsulated in James' story of how education can truly transform the lives of vulnerable children by providing them the hope and empowerment to become agents of change.

Mission 
"To ensure a secured, protected and dignified future and life for children and youth by promoting their rights, education and health."

The need for this project is encapsulated in James' story of how education can transform the life of formerly enslaved and vulnerable children, provide boys and girls with hope, and empower them to become agents of change.

Activities 

Challenging Heights utilizes education, economic empowerment and community mobilization to address the causal factors of child slavery in Ghana. In 2011, the Challenging Heights School accommodated more than 600 students and directly supported over 1,400 children and their parents. The efforts of Challenging Heights have not only resulted in the reduction of child trafficking in the region, but has also dramatically increased enrollment and retention rates at local schools, through multilateral partnerships.

With a grant from Hovde Foundation, Challenging Heights completed the construction of Ghana's largest and most comprehensive aftercare shelter. With a 60-child capacity this shelter is now the first point of refuge for rescued children, offering holistic rehabilitation, education, survivor support, medical care, and love!

Challenging Heights advocates for children at the legislative level, performs regular rescues, and operates a school that helps reintegrate child slaves that have been rescued.

Challenging Heights also raises awareness about the issue through collaboration with the international news media, as well as their work with celebrities—such as Jason Mraz and Archbishop Desmond Tutu of The Elders.

Funding 
Hovde Foundation, Free the Slaves, Global Fund for Children, American Jewish World Service, Freedom for All, UNICEF and private donations.

Media References 
Coverage of Challenging Heights on CNN International's Inside Africa television feature

See also 
Child slavery
Trafficking of children
Human trafficking

References

External links 
 Challenging Heights Web Site

Child-related organisations in Ghana